The Texas Music Educators Association (TMEA) is an organization of over 12,000 Texas school music educators.  Its stated goals are to provide professional growth opportunities, to encourage interaction among music education professionals, to foster public support for music in schools, to offer quality musical experiences for students, to cultivate universal appreciation and lifetime involvement in music, and to develop and maintain productive working relationships with other professional organizations.

History
TMEA was founded in 1920 by James E. King(1885-1947) and originally called the Texas Band Teachers Association.

Once an affiliate of MENC: The National Association for Music Education, TMEA was expelled as the state affiliate largely due to policy disputes over compulsory MENC membership in 1975.  Essentially, at the time of federated status, TMEA members had the option to join TMEA without paying dues to MENC. MENC found this arrangement untenable and urged TMEA to revise its constitution to require all TMEA members to pay full MENC dues and affiliate with MENC. This question was repeatedly put before TMEA membership who rejected it in ballot after ballot. MENC officially expelled TMEA, what would have been and would remain today its largest affiliated organization, on June 30, 1975. TMEA assisted MENC in the creation of the "Texas Music Educators Conference," to be a Texas MENC affiliate. Prior to the expulsion, over 1000 TMEA members voluntarily maintained MENC membership, however in its first report to MENC, the newly formed TMEC claimed only 99 members statewide.

Issues regarding the dominance of TMEA by the state's larger schools (those in UIL Classes AAAA and AAAAA) led to the 1991 formation of the Association of Texas Small School Bands (ATSSB), membership in which is limited to schools in UIL Classes A, AA, and AAA.  However, TMEA and ATSSB (along with other organizations, such as the Texas Bandmasters Association, which also split from TMEA in the 1940s) work together to promote music education in Texas.

Functions

All-State
TMEA is responsible for auditions into and concerts of Texas's All-Region and All-State bands, orchestras and choirs. It aligns schools into the 33 regions which are used by the University Interscholastic League (UIL) and the Association of Texas Small School Bands (ATSSB) for their competitions. The audition music is announced at the yearly Texas Bandmasters Association (TBA) convention in San Antonio, usually in July.

Auditions are held at the region level during the fall of each year to determine All-City, All-District and All-Region groups. Most regions host a public concert of their All-Region bands, orchestras and choirs to provide a performance clinic for the selected musicians and to showcase the students' musicianship.

Top ranked musicians from each region advance to their respective All-Area auditions. The All-Area groups serve to reduce the number of participants considered for All-State and therefore do not have a performance component as do the All-Region groups.

A final audition is held among the top All-Area musicians to decide membership in the All-State groups. Student musicians selected for an All-State group are invited to attend the annual TMEA convention and participate in a performance clinic and concert. The All-State groups include the following:

List of Texas All-State Groups
6A Symphonic Band
6A Concert Band
5A Symphonic Band
Jazz Ensemble I
Jazz Ensemble II
Symphony Orchestra
Philharmonic Orchestra
Sinfonietta Orchestra (replaced the String Orchestra in 2018-19)
Large School Mixed Choir
Small School Mixed Choir
Treble Choir
Tenor/Bass Choir
TTCCDA Choir
TCCBDA Symphonic Band
TCCBDA Jazz Ensemble
ATSSB Symphonic Band
ATSSB Concert Band
ATSSB Jazz Ensemble

Clinic/Convention
TMEA hosts an annual convention in San Antonio during the month of February. The convention's main attractions are workshops that qualify as continuing education credit for music teachers, an exhibition show for the music industry and concerts by many honor and invited groups. Concerts performed by the All-State groups provide a finale for the convention.

Southwestern Musician
Southwestern Musician is an official publication of TMEA. Content includes various articles on music education and information about TMEA events and operations. Nine issues are published during the school year.

References

Further reading
 ProQuest, Biffle, George Leslie (1991) A history of the Texas Music Educators Association, 1959-1979. D.M.A. dissertation, Arizona State University. Retrieved September 13, 2008, from Dissertations & Theses: Full Text database. (Publication No. AAT 9124786)..
 Texas Music Educators Association. Minutes and Proceedings of the Texas Music Educators Association, 1924-1961. Austin: Texas Music Educators Association, 1961. 780.706 T355M 1961
 Daniel Ross Grant, “The Texas Music Educators Association: A Historical Study of Selected Landmark Events Between 1938 and 1980 and the Decisions Which Influenced Their Outcomes” (Ph.D. diss., University of North Texas, 1989).
 Texas Music Office, Texas Music Education Primer, (Austin: Office of the Governor, 1995, 1997; now available at Texas Music Education Primer ).
 
 Grant, Daniel Ross, 1955-. The Texas Music Educators Association: A Historical Study of Selected Landmark Events Between 1938 and 1980 and the Decisions Which Influenced Their Outcomes. Denton, Texas. UNT Digital Library. https://digital.library.unt.edu/ark:/67531/metadc331139/. Accessed March 11, 2016.

External links
TMEA's official website
Texas Jazz Educators Association
Texas Music Adjucators Association
Texas Association of Music Schools

Music education organizations
Music competitions in the United States
Concerts
Music conferences
Education in Texas
Organizations based in Austin, Texas
Texas classical music